2-(Diphenylphosphino)anisole is the organophosphorus compound  with the formula (C6H5)2PC6H4-2-OCH3.  It is a white solid that is soluble in organic solvents.  The compound is used as a ligand in organometallic chemistry and homogeneous catalysis.  It is the prototypical hemilabile ligand. This compound is prepared from 2-bromoanisole.

Related ligands
Tris(4-methoxyphenyl)phosphine
Triphenylphosphine

References

Tertiary phosphines
Phenyl compounds
Benzene derivatives